Interventions is a book by Noam Chomsky, an American academic linguist and political activist. Published in May 2007, Interventions is a collection of 44 op-ed articles, post-9/11, from September 2002, through March 2007. The book's subjects span from 9/11 and the Iraq War to social security and intelligent design, South America and Asia, the Israeli occupation of Palestine and the election of Hamas, Hurricane Katrina, and the US concept of "just war". The Pentagon banned the book from its Guantanamo Bay prison because it might negatively "impact... good order and discipline." Chomsky replied that, "This happens sometimes in totalitarian regimes."

Background
Chomsky was first approached to write an op-ed column for the New York Times Syndicate on the first anniversary of the September 11 attacks on the basis of his work 9/11 (2001). The international attention garnered by the subsequent column, entitled "9-11: Lessons Unlearned," convinced the publishers to commission Chomsky to write roughly 1,000 words a month which they would then distribute as op-ed pieces. These columns were syndicated overseas, but rarely licensed in the United States; The New York Times itself did not publish them. A second volume of these, collecting columns from April 2, 2007 to October 31, 2011, was published as Making the Future (2012).

See also
 September 11 attacks
 Interventionism (politics)
 Foreign policy of the United States

Sources

External links
 Interventions

2007 non-fiction books
Books about foreign relations of the United States
Books about politics of the United States
Books by Noam Chomsky
Non-fiction books about war
Hamish Hamilton books
City Lights Publishers books